"A Lion Walks Among Us" is a 1961 episode of the TV drama series Bus Stop, with guest star Fabian Forte, which was highly controversial because of its depiction of violence. It was an early work of director Robert Altman.

Plot
The District Attorney's wife, Sally, picks up hitchhiker Luke Freeman on the way to Sunrise, Colorado. He makes a play for her but she kicks him out of the car.

Luke then robs a grocery store, killing the grocer, Mr Jordan, by throwing him against a table then shooting him dead. After doing this, Luke sings a song to himself, "I Couldn't Hear Nobody Pray".

Luke goes on to visit a tavern, Jefty's Road House, where he starts a brawl after flirting with a young girl, Linda, and singing a song. He pulls a switchblade but before the fight gets too serious Sheriff Will Mayberry intervenes and brings him in for questioning about the shooting at the grocery store.

Luke tries to cover, telling a story about the woman who gave him a lift into town and tried to seduce him. The D.A. Glenn Wagner realises he is talking about his wife, and attacks Luke. Luke is arrested for robbery and murder and put on trial. He sings while in prison.

Sally is called to give evidence but Luke's lawyer, Oliver West, discredits her by bringing up her alcoholism, her treatment by a psychiatrist and her attraction to Luke. Sally breaks down on the stand and the judge releases Luke on the ground of insufficient evidence.

By this stage Luke has a group of female fans, including Linda from the Tavern. Luke needs money for a ticket out of town. He asks Linda, who slaps his face. He then robs and murders his lawyer for the money.

Sally swings by and offers him a lift. He accepts but Sally then drives off a cliff, killing them both in a murder-suicide.

Cast

Regulars
Marilyn Maxwell as Grace Sherwood
Rhodes Reason as Will Mayberry
Richard Anderson as Glenn Wagner

Guests
Fabian Forte as Luke Freeman
Dianne Foster as Sally Wagner
Philip Abbott as Oliver
Jenny Maxwell as Linda
Dabbs Greer as Jeffrey

Production
The script was based on the novel The Judgement by Tom Wicker. The working title of the show was "Told By an Idiot" but this was changed shortly before airing "to point up the moral more strongly", according to the network.  The episode title is explained by a pair of intertitles, at the episode start and end, presenting the Bible verse source.

The part of a psychopathic killer was completely different to anything Fabian had done. "Robert Altman wasn't sure that I could do it", recalls the singer. "So I had to audition for him.  And it was a wonderful experience.  He looked at me and he said, 'You got it.'"

"I was nervous as hell", says Fabian. "I walked in and he reminded me of a hippy-dippy kind of guy which I loved. He was cool, he was warm, he asked me a lot about my personal life, I guess to put me at ease."

Altman later remembered "Fabian was just a kid, not a good actor, and I worked with him, not trying to teach me about to act but just to loosen him up."

"At first he wanted to improvise a few things about the character", recalls Fabian. "I read with him. We read from the script and I think it was because of his input I totally transformed myself into this really f*cked up guy. He opened windows into the guy – "how would you feel if you had this in your post?" He really wanted you to have that power to see if you could do it. We did it eight or nine different ways. He didn't say much, just a word here or a word there. He had the power to make you go to another dimension. He was that way on set, too. He never bludgeoned you or was hard with you. He was very astute – very few words but right to the point emotionally. Then he'd walk away. He did that with all the actors. To me it was, "Wow if this is the way acting is, this is what I want to be part of."

Altman remembers that Fabian would often come to the director's house, where Altman's 12-year-old daughter kept a Kleenex on which Fabian had blown his nose.

Reception
The episode was criticized for its violence. The series' primary sponsor, the Brown and Williamson Tobacco Company, refused to sponsor the program, claiming that the presence of Fabian would lure teenage audiences to what should be adult viewing. Warner Bros agreed to step in to promote their film The Roman Spring of Mrs Stone; as the main sponsors had refused to advertise, trailers for upcoming movies and episodes of the show were promoted instead. Twenty-five ABC affiliates refused to air the program.

There was much discussion over when to air it. ABC president Oliver Treyz refused to pull it from the station's line up, but when it went out it was without commercials other than for other ABC shows.

"It has a very moral point", argues producer Robert Blees. "Roy Huggins was a very devout Catholic – it was sometimes almost impossible to keep his Catholicism out of the show. All the people who criticised it for being evil or approving of crime are absolutely wrong."

Critical response
The Chicago Daily Tribune said Fabian played his part "effectively" but that "TV like this is a stimulant to crime and has no place in the living room on a mid-Sunday evening".

Jack Gould of The New York Times called it:

A few days later Gould attacked the program again, calling the show:

Gould complained about the program in a third column in April 1962 on censorship on television.

Richard Van Enger's editing won him second prize for best TV editing of the year at the American Cinema Editors Awards.

Political impact
The show attracted negative comment from politicians in Washington, where Senator Thomas J. Dodd led a Congressional Committee into violence on television. The show was shown to the Committee and Treyz was cross examined about the program and said that he did not wish to discourage creative artists by "blue pencilling" their work.

Treyz later admitted broadcasting the program was a mistake. He was fired from ABC, Bus Stop was axed and its executive producer Roy Huggins was unable to get up any other shows with its production company, 20th Century Fox. "A Lion Walks Among Us" never screened again on prime time TV.

Roy Huggins who executive produced the episode later argued in Variety that its intention had been misunderstood:

A TV critic later described this argument as "Higgins' false premise, distorted description and bogus conclusion."

Fabian's career
Fabian was one of the few to benefit from the program, which have a new respect for his acting. "This whole town looks at me differently now – I can feel it", he said. "It's a funny thing, though about that show. I think if it had been one of Hitchcock's TV shows and with no big name in it, nobody would have heard of it."

"The reviews were the best I ever got as an actor", he later reflected. "I give Altman a lot of credit for that."

His performance led to him receiving an offer to act in The Dick Powell Show and also The Longest Day. He later added:

Proposed film version
According to Fabian, 20th Century Fox wanted to shoot some extra scenes and turn the episode into a feature film version for release in Europe. However he says he turned it down because "I could see it as being advertised over there as a wild kind of thing, and I didn't think it would do me any good."

In later years however he said he "was praying they would make the motion picture. But because of the heat, the advertisers, and the hearings with Senator Dodd, they buried it. That would have changed my whole life. Well, it might have."

References

External links

"A Lion Walks Among Us" at BFI
"A Lion Walks Among Us" at Fabianforte.net

1961 American television episodes